Anwar Elfeitori (Arabic أنور الفيتوري) is a Libyan Telecommunications Engineer born on 1964 in Benghazi, Libya . Elfeitori served as the minister for Transportation and Communication on the executive office of the National Transitional Council, from 10 May 2011 to 22 November 2011. He was named Minister for Communications and Information Technology on 22 November 2011 by Abdurrahim El-Keib.

Most recently Minister Elfeitori signed an agreement with NATO to open parts of the Libyan airspace. Dr. Elfeitori is currently focusing on transporting wounded Libyans who need specialist care. The reopened airspace features routes to and from airports including Tripoli, Misrata, Benghazi, Malta, and Cairo.

External links 
 Nato, Libya agreement paves way for limited commercial flights
 Air Malta to send technical delegation to Libya
 Militia hands over Tripoli airport to government

References 

Government ministers of Libya
Living people
Members of the National Transitional Council
Members of the Interim Government of Libya
1964 births
People of the First Libyan Civil War
Libyan engineers
University of Benghazi alumni
University of British Columbia alumni
University of Waterloo alumni
People from Benghazi
Ambassadors of Libya to Malaysia